Introducing the Psychedelic Soul Jazz Guitar of Joe Jones is the debut album by guitarist Joe Jones which was recorded in 1967 and released on the Prestige label.

Reception

Allmusic awarded the album 2 stars.

Track listing 
All compositions by Joe Jones except as noted
 "The Mindbender" (Jay Douglas) - 4:50
 "There Is a Mountain" (Donovan) - 5:34 
 "Games" (Nat Adderley) - 4:20 
 "Sticks and Stones" (Titus Turner) - 5:00 
 "Blues for Bruce" (Jay Douglas) - 5:50 
 "The Beat Goes On" (Sonny Bono) - 3:18  
 "Right Now" - 3:19 
 "Call Me" (Tony Hatch) - 6:04   
Recorded at Van Gelder Studio in Englewood Cliffs, New Jersey on March 15 (tracks 3, 5, 8 & 9) and December 12 (tracks 1, 2, 4, 6 & 7), 1967

Personnel 
Joe Jones - guitar
Limerick Knowles Jr. organ (tracks 3, 5, 8 & 9)
Ron Carter - bass (tracks 1, 2, 4, 6 & 7)
Alexander Witherspoon - electric bass (tracks 3, 5, 8 & 9)
Ben Dixon (tracks 1, 2, 4, 6 & 7), Bud Kelly (tracks 3, 5, 8 & 9) - drums
Richie "Pablo" Landrum - congas  (tracks 3, 5, 8 & 9)

References 

Boogaloo Joe Jones albums
1968 debut albums
Prestige Records albums
Albums recorded at Van Gelder Studio
Albums produced by Cal Lampley